Resolution enhancement technology (RET) is a form of image processing technology used to manipulate dot characteristics popular among laser printer and inkjet printer manufacturers. Closely related RET  techniques are also used in VLSI photolithography manufacturing technology, in particular in relation to 90 nanometre technology.

Resolution refers to the sharpness of image detail, smoothness of curved lines, and the faithful reproduction of an image. In both cases, RET uses pre-compensation of the image in order to try to mitigate the effects of the printing process. 

Among the major issues in RET in VLSI technology are the fundamental properties of a wave: amplitude, phase, and direction.

See also 
 Resolution enhancement technologies

External reference 

Image processing
Printing